Alone in the Dark is a 2005 action horror film directed by Uwe Boll and written by Elan Mastai, Michael Roesch, and Peter Scheerer. Based on the video game series of the same name, it stars Christian Slater, Tara Reid, and Stephen Dorff as paranormal investigators who combat a supernatural threat. The film's story is an adaptation of the game Alone in the Dark: The New Nightmare (2001).

Upon release, the film received overwhelmingly negative reviews for the story, dialogue, special effects, and Reid's performance. Holding a 1% approval rating on Rotten Tomatoes,  Alone in the Dark is considered one of the worst films ever made. It was also a box-office bomb, grossing $12.7 million on a $20 million budget, although the home media releases were more successful. A sequel with a different cast and story was released to home media in 2008; Boll served as a producer.

Plot

Paranormal investigator and former agent of Agency 713, Edward Carnby has a nightmare in which he hides from alien-like creatures as a child. Edward is on board a commercial airliner while en route to an urban museum where his girlfriend, Aline Cedric, works as an assistant curator. Edward holds within his hands an artifact-puzzle piece of the Abkani, an extinct Native American tribe. After leaving the airport in a taxi, a strange man follows and attacks Edward and his cab driver with supernatural durability and strength, trying to steal the artifact, but eventually dies after many escape attempts by Edward.

At the same time, in a different location, a ship recovers a coffin made of gold from the ocean floor. After docking, the captain locks up Prof. Hudgens (curator of said museum) while his crew opens the gold coffin against better judgment. Hudgens escapes his imprisonment to find everyone killed by a mysterious creature and the coffin empty. Hudgens finds a secret compartment and collects an artifact from the coffin, and he slips away ashore.

Upon opening the gold coffin, several people across the western USA and Canada walk off into the night after hearing an ear-splitting screech. During which, Edward passes out while studying his artifact. At the same time, Bureau 713 (B-713) is also made aware by a surveillance team of evidence of electromagnetic waves.

Edward thinks it's related to the Abkani as everyone who disappeared that same night was from the same location. Edward arrives that evening at the museum where he is reunited with Aline with the artifact, and she shows him another Abkani artifact that recently arrived that she has been working on since Prof. Hudgens was away. The mysterious creature from the ship attacks them inside the museum, killing a security guard, but Edward and Aline hide in a storage closet long enough for troopers from Bureau 713 to arrive, and the creature retreats into the night.

Commander Burke, team leader of the B-713 strike force, arrives where Edward tries to relay information to him, but Burke rebukes him, saying that since he no longer works to stay out of it. Edward tries to get information from his former co-workers at B-713, like staff surgeon and pathologist Sam Fischer, to learn more about the creature encountered and the Abnaki's history.

Prof. Hudgens arrives back at the museum to his office, where he has a captured creature. Hudgens uses a syringe to draw fluid from the captive creature to study it as part of his further research to combine the DNA of man and beast. Edward continues investigating his past by going to his former orphanage to learn more about Hudgens' research, and back to his apartment where he and Aline have sex.

While the Bureau 713 soldiers are patrolling the museum, they are attacked by several creatures, who are the missing people that wandered off upon the opening of the gold coffin. During the firefight, several soldiers and most of the human-creatures are killed. Edward arrives on the scene and talks more with Burke, who again tells him to stay away. However, during a scuffle, Edward picks Burke's pocket containing his Bureau 713 security badge.

Edward goes to Bureau 713 where he talks with Fischer in the morgue looking at one of the dead bodies, and Fischer shows Edward a small, centipede-like creature in the dorsal spine of his old friend. Fischer also discovers that Edward has one of his own in his body, but it is dead, presumably because of the electroshock Edward had as a child. Burke and his men arrive and escort Edward out of the building. That evening, Professor Hudgens ambushes Fischer at his home and inserts a baby creature into Fischer's mouth.

Edward discovers that the Abkani had fought those creatures which can get killed by light. They also disrupt electrical light, creating blackouts. The Abkani artifacts found all over the world actually open the gate to another dimension, where millions of those creatures are sleeping, waiting to be freed. Hudgens makes further experiments, injecting himself with the blood of one of the creatures, granting him the ability to control the monsters.

Edward, Aline, Burke, and Burke's military squad go to an abandoned gold mine near Edward's orphanage, where there are strong electromagnetic disruptions. They are attacked by dozens of the creatures and all of the humans except Edward, Aline, and Burke are killed. They reach the old surgery room underground where the baby creature was transplanted into Edward. There, Hudgens takes Edward's artifact and opens the gate. Millions of creatures start to wake up and run towards the gate. Burke kills Hudgens, and the group places a bomb and runs away, only to realize that they cannot detonate the bomb from such a long distance. Burke goes back and sacrifices himself.

Edward and Aline rise to the surface at dawn but find an evacuated city with cars abandoned on the streets. As they walk down the street, something runs toward them.

Cast
 Christian Slater as Edward Carnby: Raised at an orphanage under Sister Clara, Carnby lost his memory when he was ten years old. At twenty, he was recruited by Bureau 713, gaining knowledge on the paranormal soon after. His current assignment is investigating his past along with researching the disappearance of the Abkani. Due to the experiments conducted on him as a child, he has the ability to sense paranormal activity and has increased strength and speed, which allow him to perform acrobatic moves that a normal human could not do.
 Dustyn Arthurs as Young Edward
 Tara Reid as Aline Cedrac, an archaeologist and museum curator; Edward's girlfriend who knows about the Abkani and their culture.
 Stephen Dorff as Commander Richard Burke, the Commander of Bureau 713, formerly worked under Carnby's direction.
 Frank C. Turner as Agent Fischer, the head of the medical unit of Bureau 713; he is one of Carnby's few trusted allies and friends.
 Matthew Walker as Professor Lionel Hudgens
 Will Sanderson as Agent Miles
 Mike Dopud as Agent Turner; he is killed by Fischer while working on a power generator
 Françoise Yip as Agent Cheung
 Mark Acheson as Captain Chernick
 Darren Shahlavi as John Dillon
 Karin Konoval as Sister Clara, owner of the orphanage which cared for Edward. In the '80s, she was persuaded by Hudgens to allow experiments on the orphans. She keeps this secret from everyone but is inwardly guilty for her immoral actions.
 Ed Anders as James Pinkerton, a former Agent of Bureau 713 who went missing in action in the 1980s. He and Hudgens were in charge of the investigation of the disappearance of gold-miners at Brutan Goldmine. Pinkerton became an experiment for Hudgens, who attached a Xenos creature to his spine. His abilities included increased awareness, strength, speed and willpower.
 Brendan Fletcher as Cab driver

Production
Blair Erickson came up with the first drafts of the script for Alone in the Dark. According to Erickson, Uwe Boll suggested through various e-mails changes that would turn it from a thriller into an action film. Erickson stated his disgust at the treatment and spoke negatively of his working relationship with Boll on Something Awful:

As a result, there were seven distinct scripts in circulation without a consensus to which one was used.

Tara Reid starred in the film opposite Christian Slater. Artisan Pictures picked up North American distribution rights to the film in June 2003.

Release
Alone in the Dark was released in Canada and the United States on January 28, 2005. It was released in Germany on February 3, 2005.

The film was released on VHS and DVD on 10 May 2005. An unrated director's cut was released in Germany, France, and Australia and was #1 on the German DVD market for three weeks. It was released on DVD in North America on 25 September 2007. In the newest version of the film, the sex scene between Carnby and Aline has been removed.

Original film and game tie-in concept
Originally, the film version of Alone in the Dark was to be released with Alone in the Dark 5, the fifth title in the series; however, the creators of Alone in the Dark, Eden Games, delayed the game and reworked it entirely from scratch. Boll stated his disappointment on the region 1 DVD commentary but also said that Atari had face shots of Christian Slater for Alone in the Dark 5, which was released on 26 June 2008.

Reception

Box office
Alone in the Dark grossed $2.8 million in its opening weekend, ranking at #12; by the end of its run, the film had grossed $12.7 million worldwide.

Critical response

The site's critical consensus reads: "Inept on almost every level, Alone in the Dark may not work as a thriller, but it's good for some head-slapping, incredulous laughter". Metacritic gave the film a 9 out of 100 based on 25 reviews, meaning "overwhelming dislike". Audiences surveyed by CinemaScore gave the film an F grade.

Scott Brown of Entertainment Weekly gave the film an F grade, commenting that the film was "so bad it's postmodern". In the film's only positive review listed by Rotten Tomatoes, Michelle Alexandria of Eclipse Magazine wrote: "Alone in the Dark isn't going to set the world on fire, but it largely succeeds with what it has to work with. Just don't take it seriously and you'll have a fun time".

Accolades

Soundtrack

The 2-disc soundtrack was released by Nuclear Blast, with Wolfgang Herold as executive producer. The German band Agathodaimon's contribution was the title song. Finnish symphonic metal band Nightwish had a music video of "Wish I Had an Angel" directed by Uwe Boll, with clips from the film.

See also
 List of American films of 2005
 List of films based on video games
 List of films considered the worst

References

External links
 
 
 
 DVD Times review

Alone in the Dark
2005 films
2005 horror films
2000s action horror films
Canadian action horror films
Canadian science fiction horror films
German action horror films
German science fiction horror films
American action horror films
American science fiction horror films
2000s English-language films
English-language Canadian films
English-language German films
Films directed by Uwe Boll
Live-action films based on video games
Films set in the United States
Films shot in Halifax, Nova Scotia
Films shot in Vancouver
2000s monster movies
2000s science fiction horror films
Lionsgate films
Brightlight Pictures films
American monster movies
German monster movies
2000s American films
2000s Canadian films
2000s German films